Proislandiana is a genus of sheet weavers first described by A. V. Tanasevitch in 1985.

Species
 it contains two species:
Proislandiana beroni Dimitrov, 2020 –Turkey, Armenia
Proislandiana pallida (Kulczyński, 1908) – Russia (Europe to north-eastern Siberia)

See also
 List of Linyphiidae species (I–P)

References

Linyphiidae
Monotypic Araneomorphae genera
Spiders of Russia